The Language Myth is a 2014 book by Vyvyan Evans, written for a general audience. It is a direct rebuttal of Steven Pinker’s 1994 book The Language Instinct. Evans argues against Noam Chomsky’s claim that all human languages provide evidence for an underlying Universal Grammar. Evans posits, instead, a language-as-use thesis to account for the nature of language, how it is learned and how it evolves.

Reception 
The Language Myth caused considerable controversy upon publication among supporters of Chomskyan Universal Grammar. David Adger argued that the  "attack on generative linguistics misrepresents the field". Another vocal critic, Norbert Hornstein attacked the book for presenting caricatures of Chomskyan generative grammar and of providing inadequate arguments to support its main claims. Others have attacked the book for its polemical style and what are claimed to be Evans' misunderstandings of Universal Grammar.

Evans responded by claiming that it is exactly critics of the book who misunderstand. He argues that his critics do not provide a coherent argument that is falsifiable as they posit Universal Grammar as a theoretical axiom, which does not require proof or evidence to support it. He also argues that the Universal Grammar perspectives makes a claim that is biological rather than linguistic in nature, and hence one that cannot be substantiated on the basis of linguistic evidence.

Controversy 
In 2016, Language, the flagship academic journal of the Linguistic Society of America published a series of "Alternative (Re)views" by six leading linguists, all addressing The Language Myth. Evans was originally invited to contribute a response to those articles. However, his submission was rejected by the journal's review editor. Evans wrote an open-letter to the linguistics community claiming that he was being censored.

References 

2014 non-fiction books
Cambridge University Press books
Linguistics books
Generative linguistics